The Pieta prayer booklet is a book of Roman Catholic prayers. The prayers in this collection date back to the 18th century. 

Most of the prayers were first published in Toulouse, France in 1740 and over time gathered a strong following. Pope Pius IX learned of them almost a century later, and approved them in 1862.

References
 The Pieta prayer booklet ASIN B002GRSQ6U
 Virgo Sacrata 
 Amazon books

Notes

Catholic spirituality